The Fleet Farm Arena, formerly Gateway Arena, is a multi-purpose arena inside Tyson Events Center, located in Sioux City, Iowa and sponsored by Tyson Foods and Fleet Farm. The arena is commonly referred to as Tyson Events Center for marketing purposes.

The arena has three spectator levels: one suite level and two general seating levels named the 100 level and the 200 level, respectively. Its official maximum capacity is 10,000.

Owned by the City of Sioux City, it is located on the riverfront overlooking the Missouri River. The venue was operated by the city as well until January 2018 when the city contracted with Philadelphia-based venue management firm Spectra to handle matters such as booking, marketing, staffing and food and beverage service.

It is home to the Sioux City Musketeers of the United States Hockey League (USHL) and the Sioux City Bandits of Champions Indoor Football (CIF).

This arena also hosts many college tournaments associated with the NAIA, including the NAIA Wrestling National Tournament, NAIA Women's Volleyball National Tournament, and the Division II NAIA Women's National Basketball Tournament, which was won back-to-back in 2004 and 2005 by Sioux City's Morningside College Mustangs.

History
In 2002, a new arena broke ground to expand out from the old Sioux City Municipal Auditorium, which was later closed as an auditorium and converted into the Long Lines Family Recreation Center. This new arena inside Tyson Events Center opened as Gateway Arena in 2003, named for computer company Gateway, Inc. In 2007, Acer Inc. acquired Gateway but retained the Gateway Arena naming rights until the rights expired in June 2019. On September 30, 2019, retail chain Fleet Farm took over as naming rights partner under an eight-year deal which would brand the arena as Fleet Farm Arena.

While Dave Siciliano served as head coach of the Musketeers from 2000 to 2008, he designed the team's dressing room at the arena to be circular so that one could "look your teammates directly in the eye".

Hosted events

Wrestling
The site has hosted World Wrestling Entertainment on numerous occasions, including a live un-televised event on September 25, 2004, followed by a televised SmackDown on May 17, 2005; and four televised Raw programs on July 10, 2006, February 5, 2007, January 12, 2009 along with an ECW taping the same night, and Raw on July 1, 2013. There was another non-televised show on August 16, 2009. It has also hosted TNA Wrestling Live on June 4, 2010. In December 2014, there was a SmackDown televised event featuring the Immortal Hulk Hogan acting as an authority figure for the night.

In 2016 there was a WWE Live event (Smackdown) non-televised event featuring AJ Styles vs Dean Ambrose for the WWE Championship, The Usos vs Ryhno and Heath Slater for the Smackdown Tag Team Championships, The Hype Bros and American Alpha vs The Ascension and the Vaudevillians, Kalisto vs Tyler Brezze, The Miz vs Apollo Crews, Natalya and Carmela vs Emma and Naomi, Kane vs Bray Wyatt and Luke Harper and Alexa Bliss vs Becky Lynch for the Smackdown Women's Championship.

Most recently on April 22, 2019, the arena hosted non-televised WWE Live: Smackdown. The event featured 7 Matches including Charlotte Flair defeating Bayley via her signature Figure 8, Roman Reigns defeating Elias, WWE Intercontinental Champion Finn Balor defeating Mustafa Ali. The main event featured WWE Champion Kofi Kingston defeating Randy Orton to retain thanks to assistance from Kevin Owens who gave Orton a Stone Cold Stunner while the referee was knocked out and Kingston finished with his signature Trouble in Paradise.

WWE was scheduled to return to the arena on December 17, 2019 for a RAW taping that would air on December 23, 2019 but was cancelled by WWE for “scheduling conflicts” but was actually due to low ticket sales.

Entertainment
 It has hosted numerous concerts, by artists such as Aerosmith, Cheap Trick, Alan Jackson, Dolly Parton, Britney Spears, Taylor Swift, Trace Adkins, Kenny Chesney, Cher, Rascal Flatts, Fleetwood Mac, KISS, Nickelback, 311, Neil Diamond, Carrie Underwood, Little Big Town, Ozzy Osbourne, Rob Zombie, Buckcherry, The Offspring, Brad Paisley, Miranda Lambert, Whitesnake, Papa Roach and Creed and the band KISS.
 This venue has also hosted comedian Larry the Cable Guy on three occasions.
 It has also hosted Monster Truck Nationals shows.

Other events
President George W. Bush spoke here during his re-election campaign in 2004.

See also
Sioux City Municipal Auditorium

References

External links
 Tyson Event Center official website

Indoor arenas in Iowa
Music venues in Iowa
Indoor ice hockey venues in the United States
Event venues established in 2003
Sports venues completed in 2003
2003 establishments in Iowa
Buildings and structures in Sioux City, Iowa
Tourist attractions in Sioux City, Iowa